The Corriher Grange Hall is a historic Grange Hall located near the Five Points area near Enochville, Rowan County, North Carolina.  It was built in 1916, for use as a school.  A gable front addition was made in 1938.  It is a one-story weatherboarded vernacular frame building.  It served as the community school until the end of the 1934–1935, then acquired by the local Grange for use as a meeting hall.

It was listed on the National Register of Historic Places in 1982.

References

Clubhouses on the National Register of Historic Places in North Carolina
Schools in North Carolina
Buildings and structures completed in 1916
Buildings and structures in Rowan County, North Carolina
Grange organizations and buildings
National Register of Historic Places in Rowan County, North Carolina
Grange buildings on the National Register of Historic Places
1916 establishments in North Carolina